Doug Rockwell (born September 21, 1985) is an Emmy-winning songwriter, producer and musician based in Los Angeles, CA.

Background
Rockwell spent his earlier years touring as a front man for numerous rock acts. During this time, he also began his ascent into writing and producing for various artists which later earned him a seat alongside accomplished producer John Feldmann in Los Angeles. Here Doug worked with major acts like 5 Seconds Of Summer and Sleeping With Sirens.

In 2015, Rockwell signed a publishing deal with Disney Music Publishing. Since then, he has written and produced for acts such as Sofia Wylie, Joshua Bassett, Forever in Your Mind, New Hope Club, Dove Cameron, and Asher Angel.

He later began writing for television and film projects, and in 2017, won the ASCAP Screen Music Award for Top Television Series for his work on Nickelodeon's The Loud House. In 2018, Doug wrote all of the music for The Loud Houses Emmy-winning rock opera special “Really Loud Music,” which was the show's highest rated episode. In that same episode he made his television debut by voicing a character based on a fictitious version of himself. He is also known for writing many of the songs for Marvel's “Marvel Rising” franchise. 

Doug and his writing partner Tova Litvin wrote "Flesh & Bone," which became the hit song of Disney's "Zombies 2" in February of 2020 and has since gained over 250,000,000 streams across platforms worldwide, and has been RIAA Certified Gold. The duo are also responsible for writing songs on Netflix's hit musical series "Julie & The Phantoms," whose soundtrack reached number 1 on both the US and Australian iTunes charts and peaked at number 4 on the US Billboard Soundtrack chart.

Selected discography

TV and Film

Awards and nominations

References

1985 births
Living people
Musicians from Los Angeles